The Philippine megapode (Megapodius cumingii), also known as the Philippine scrubfowl or the Tabon scrubfowl, is a species of bird in the family Megapodiidae. It is found in the Philippines, northeastern Borneo, and Sulawesi. Its natural habitats are subtropical or tropical dry forest, subtropical or tropical moist lowland forest, and subtropical or tropical moist montane forest.

Description 
It has a brown back and a blue-grey front. It has bare vermillion skin round its eyes.

References 

Philippine megapode
Birds of the Philippines
Birds of Sulawesi
Philippine megapode
Taxonomy articles created by Polbot